Ing Chang-ki (23 October 1916 – 27 August 1997) was a Chinese industrialist, Go player, and Go promoter. He was the founder of the Ing Cup. He is also known for promoting the Ing rules of Go. He also promoted one of the first digital game clocks to support byoyomi, per-move time control.

Biography
Ing Chang-ki was born in Cixi County (currently Cicheng, Jiangbei District, Ningbo), Zhejiang Province in 1917. As a young man, Ing worked as a clerk in a bank in Shanghai, where he later became a famous local banker. In 1949, he went to Taipei and eventually became an industrial mogul in Taiwan.

Ing created the Ing Chang-ki Weichi Educational Foundation for further promotion of Go, while encouraging the use of the name Goe in an attempt to differentiate its name from the English verb go.

Until 2000, he sponsored a tournament and substantial prize for computer Go programs known as the Ing Prize.

See also
Chang-ki Cup
Ing Cup

References

External links
Shanghai Ing Chang-ki Weichi Educational Foundation
Ing Rules of Go, including a short biography.

1916 births
1997 deaths
Ing, Chang-ki
Taiwanese Go players
Taiwanese bankers
Sportspeople from Ningbo
Chinese bankers
Chinese Civil War refugees
Taiwanese people from Zhejiang
People from Cixi